Palaeortyx is an extinct genus of granivorous galliform bird that lived 28.4 to 2.588 million years ago. It lived from the early Eocene to the early Pliocene, and may be a phasianid or odontophorid. It is known from several fossils found in Germany, France, Italy, Hungary and Romania.

References

Galliformes
Fossil taxa described in 1869